Mohammad Kiadarbandsari (born 9 October 1989 in Tehran) is an alpine skier from Iran. who won the first ever Asian Winter Games medal for Iran at 2011 Asian Winter Games. He competed for Iran at the 2018 Winter Olympics.

References

External links

1989 births
Living people
Iranian male alpine skiers
Asian Games bronze medalists for Iran
Alpine skiers at the 2014 Winter Olympics
Alpine skiers at the 2018 Winter Olympics
Olympic alpine skiers of Iran
Asian Games medalists in alpine skiing
Alpine skiers at the 2011 Asian Winter Games
Medalists at the 2011 Asian Winter Games
Alpine skiers at the 2017 Asian Winter Games